Cipriano Nunes dos Santos (born 13 October 1901 in Almada – Deceased), former Portuguese footballer who played for Sporting and the Portugal national team, as goalkeeper.

International career 
Cipriano made his debut for the National team 24 January 1926 in Porto against Czechoslovakia, in a 1–1 draw. He gained 2 caps and was a non-playing member of Portugals squad at the 1928 Football Olympic Tournament.

References

External links 
 

1901 births
Sportspeople from Almada
Sporting CP footballers
Portugal international footballers
Portuguese footballers
Olympic footballers of Portugal
Footballers at the 1928 Summer Olympics
1964 deaths
Association football goalkeepers